André Lavagne (12 July 1913 – 21 March 2014) was a French composer. He mostly worked on short movies, such as: L'amour maternel chez les animaux  (1944) and Un amour de parapluie (1951). He was born in Paris. Lavagne died from natural causes on 21 March 2014 in Paris. He was 100 years old.

References

External links
 

1913 births
2014 deaths
French centenarians
20th-century French composers
Musicians from Paris
Conservatoire de Paris alumni
Prix de Rome for composition
Commandeurs of the Légion d'honneur
French film score composers
French male film score composers
20th-century French male musicians
Men centenarians